The Real Thing is an album led by drummer Louis Hayes which was recorded in 1977 and released on the Muse label.

Reception 

The Allmusic review stated "On three little-known tunes and a trio of group originals, the modern hard bop unit plays concise but meaningful solos; a different combination of musicians gets the solo spotlight on each song. A well-conceived and continually interesting session".

Track listing 
 "St. Peter's Walk" (Tex Allen) – 5:20
 "Nisha" (Louis Hayes) – 9:22
 "Loose Suite" (Ronnie Mathews) – 4:55
 "My Gift to You" (Stafford James) – 7:00
 "Jack's Tune" (Jackie McLean) – 5:14
 "Marilyn's House" (Allen) – 5:15

Personnel 
Louis Hayes – drums
Woody Shaw – trumpet, flugelhorn
Slide Hampton – trombone (tracks 4-6)
Rene McLean – soprano saxophone, alto saxophone, tenor saxophone (tracks 1 & 3-6)
Ronnie Mathews – piano
Stafford James – bass

References 

Louis Hayes albums
1978 albums
Muse Records albums
Albums produced by Michael Cuscuna